Prince George, Duke of Cambridge (George William Frederick Charles; 26 March 1819 – 17 March 1904) was a member of the British royal family, a grandson of King George III and cousin of Queen Victoria. The Duke was an army officer by profession and served as Commander-in-Chief of the Forces (military head of the British Army) from 1856 to 1895. He became Duke of Cambridge in 1850 and field marshal in 1862.  Deeply devoted to the old Army, he worked with Queen Victoria to defeat or minimise every reform proposal, such as setting up a general staff. His Army became a moribund and stagnant institution. Its weaknesses were dramatically revealed by the poor organisation at the start of the Second Boer War.

Early life
Prince George was born at Cambridge House. His father was Prince Adolphus, Duke of Cambridge, the seventh son of King George III and Queen Charlotte. His mother was the Duchess of Cambridge (née Princess Augusta of Hesse-Kassel).

He was baptised at Cambridge House (94 Piccadilly, London) on 11 May 1819, by the Reverend John Sanford, his father's Domestic Chaplain. His godparents were the Prince Regent (represented by the Duke of Clarence and St Andrews), the Duke of Clarence and St Andrews (represented by the 4th Earl of Mayo) and the Dowager Queen of Württemberg (represented by the Countess of Mayo).

Military career
Prince George of Cambridge was educated in Hanover and from 1830 in England by the Rev. J. R. Wood, a canon of Worcester Cathedral. Like his father, he embarked upon a military career, initially becoming a colonel in the Hanoverian Army and then, on 3 November 1837, becoming a brevet colonel in the British Army. He was attached to the staff at Gibraltar from October 1838 to April 1839. After serving in Ireland with the 12th Royal Lancers (Prince of Wales's), he was appointed substantive lieutenant-colonel of the 8th Light Dragoons on 15 April 1842 and colonel of the 17th Lancers on 25 April 1842.

From 1843 to 1845 he served as a colonel on the staff in the Ionian islands, then was promoted Major-General on 7 May 1845. He succeeded to his father's titles of Duke of Cambridge, Earl of Tipperary, and Baron Culloden on 8 July 1850.

The Duke of Cambridge became Inspector of the Cavalry in 1852. In February 1854, at an early stage in the Crimean War of 1853–1856, he received command of the 1st Division (Guards and Highland brigades) of the British army in the East.  On 19 June 1854, he was promoted to the rank of lieutenant-general. 
He was present at the battles of the Alma (September 1854), Balaclava (October 1854) and Inkerman (November 1854), and at the siege of Sevastopol (1854–1855).

In December 1854, owing to illness, the Earl of Cardigan returned first to Malta and then to England: before the conclusion of the Crimean campaign he was back in London. Meanwhile, Lord Raglan died at 9.30 pm on 28 June 1855 from dysentery; General Simpson succeeded Raglan in commanding in the Crimea, followed by General Codrington. Field Marshal Viscount Hardinge, the serving general commanding-in-chief since 1852, was forced to resign in July 1856 on grounds of ill-health. (The Crimean War had ended in March 1856.)

On 5 July 1856, the Duke was appointed general commanding-in-chief of the British Army, a post that was re-titled field marshal commanding-in-chief on 9 November 1862 and commander-in-chief of the forces by Letters Patent on 20 November 1887. In that capacity he served as the chief military advisor to the Secretary of State for War, with responsibility for the administration of the army and the command of forces in the field. He was promoted to the rank of general on 15 July 1856 and to the rank of field marshal on 9 November 1862.

Policies

The Duke of Cambridge served as commander-in-chief for 39 years. Early in his term he encouraged the army to trial various breech-loading carbines for the cavalry, one of which—the Westley-Richards—proved so effective that it was decided to investigate the possibility of producing a version for the infantry. In 1861, 100 were issued to five infantry battalions; in 1863 an order of 2,000 was placed for further trials. The Duke was also involved in the formation of the Staff College and of the Royal Military School of Music, and became governor of the Royal Military Academy, Woolwich: he further sought to improve the efficiency of the army by advocating a scheme of annual military manoeuvres. In 1860 he introduced a new system to restrict corporal punishment: soldiers became eligible for flogging only in cases of aggravated mutinous conduct during wartime, unless they committed an offence serious enough to degrade to the second class and make them once again subject to corporal punishment.  A year's good behaviour would return them to the first class, meaning that only a hard core of incorrigible offenders tended to be flogged.

Opposition to reforms

Under the Duke's command, the British Army became a moribund and stagnant institution.  There were no new ideas.  He allegedly rebuked one of his more intelligent subordinates with the words: "Brains? I don't believe in brains! You haven't any, I know, Sir!"  He was equally forthright on his reluctance to adopt change: "There is a time for everything, and the time for change is when you can no longer help it."

In the wake of the Prussian victories in the 1870–71 Franco-Prussian War, the Liberal Party government of Prime Minister William Gladstone and Secretary of State for War Edward Cardwell called for the Army to undergo major reforms. Cardwell succeeded in pushing through a number of reforms, including one that made the commander-in-chief nominally report to the secretary of state for war.

The Duke opposed most of the reforms because they struck at the heart of his view of the Army. According to Theo Aronson, he "stoutly resisted almost every attempt at reform or modernization." He feared that the newly created force of reservists would be of little use in a colonial conflict, and that expeditionary forces would have to strip the most experienced men from the home-based battalions in order to fill the gaps in their ranks. His fears seemed to be confirmed in 1873, when Wolseley raided battalions for the expedition against the Ashanti. In 1881, when the historic numbers of regiments were abolished and facing colours standardised for English, Welsh, Scottish, and Irish regiments, the Duke protested that regimental spirit would be degraded; the majority of facing colours were restored by the time of World War I, although the numbers of regiments were not.

The reforming impetus, however, continued. Parliament passed the War Office Act 1870, which formally subordinated the Commander-in-Chief of the Forces to the Secretary of State for War and in 1871 Cardwell abolished the custom of purchasing an office which had done much to instil elitism in the form of discipline and training. The Duke of Cambridge strongly resented this move, a sentiment shared by a majority of officers, who would no longer be able to sell their commissions when they retired.

Pressures for reform built up as the Duke of Cambridge aged; his strongest ally was his cousin, Queen Victoria. While the Queen insisted on reform, she was also protective of the Household brigades and their long association and traditions. An 1890 royal commission led by Lord Hartington (later the 8th Duke of Devonshire) criticised the administration of the War Office and recommended the devolution of authority from the Commander-in-Chief to subordinate military officers. A number of reformers opposed to the Duke banded together, including Campbell-Bannerman and Lansdowne, the Liberal and Conservative Secretaries for War between 1892 and 1900. The leading generals eager to replace the Duke were Wolseley, Buller (1802–1884), Roberts (1832–1914), and the Duke of Connaught (1850–1942). The Duke of Cambridge was forced to resign his post on 1 November 1895, and was succeeded by Lord Wolseley. On his resignation he was given the title of honorary colonel-in-chief to the Forces.

Historian Correlli Barnett blames British failures in the Second Boer War of 1899–1902 on the Duke, stressing the Army's "[l]ack of organization, ignorant and casual officers, inferior human material in the ranks" as well as "soldiers drilled to machine-like movements [versus the Boer] with a rifle working on his own initiative."

Friend of Haig 

During the Duke's long career he helped to further the career progress of Douglas Haig, a talented and able young officer, who succeeded through Staff College to gain promotion.  As Commander-in-Chief, the Duke was able to admit any candidate to the college so long as they passed three out of eight of the tests. Haig, who was also acquainted with Sir Evelyn Wood, left for India in 1893 knowing that the Duke had also made a friend of Henrietta Jameson (née Haig), his older sister.  The Duke's nomination was made in 1894 and 1895, but Haig did not take up the place until 15 January 1896 under Army Regulations Order 72 (1896).  The Duke, who was replaced by Lord Wolseley, after 32 years was not the only patron of preferment.  The Staff College was not intended to educate a General Staff until much later in its historical development.  However the traditional system of informal patronage was gradually giving way to more than gifted amateurs.

On 22 November 1909 the reforms to which Haig, as Director of Staff Duties was a part, abolished the post of Commander-in-Chief which the Duke had made his own.  In setting up the Army Council, with its head being called the Chief of the General Staff by Order in Council, the Liberal government separated the army from the monarchy.

Marriage and mistress

It is believed, according to Roger Fulford, that William IV, who had been his godfather when Duke of Clarence, had George brought up at Windsor in hope of an eventual marriage to his cousin Princess Victoria of Kent, who was two months younger. This prospective match was favoured by George's own parents, but was forestalled by Victoria's maternal uncle Leopold I of Belgium. He secured Victoria's betrothal to his nephew, Prince Albert of Saxe-Coburg and Gotha, which became formal after she succeeded to the British throne. In 1839 Queen Victoria wrote to Albert about George's father: "The Duke told Lord Melbourne he had always greatly desired our marriage, and never thought of George: but that I don't believe."  George was one of a range of suitors considered by Victoria, the most prominent of whom, Prince Alexander of the Netherlands, was openly favoured by William.

The Duke of Cambridge made no secret of his view that "arranged marriages were doomed to failure." He was married privately and in contravention of the 1772 Royal Marriages Act at St John Clerkenwell, London, on 8 January 1847 to Sarah Fairbrother (1816 – 12 January 1890), the daughter of John Fairbrother, a servant in Westminster. Sarah Fairbrother (whose stage name was Louisa) had been an actress since 1827, performing at Drury Lane, the Lyceum, and Covent Garden Theatre. As the marriage was contrary to the Royal Marriages Act, the Duke's wife was not titled Duchess of Cambridge or accorded the style Her Royal Highness, nor was their son born after the marriage eligible to succeed to the Duke's titles. Indeed, Sarah's very existence was ignored by the Queen. Instead, Sarah called herself "Mrs. Fairbrother" and later "Mrs. FitzGeorge". The Duke was a very weak man where women were concerned, and it seems likely that he had been cajoled into marriage by Sarah (then pregnant for the fifth time), she herself obtaining the licence. Legend has created for the couple an ideal relationship that is far from the reality; the Duke having other affairs.
From 1837 the Duke had known Louisa Beauclerk, third daughter of Sir George Wombwell, 2nd Baronet, whom he later described as "the idol of my life and my existence." He saw much of her in 1847, and she was his mistress from at least 1849 until her death in 1882. As early as 1849 he had decided that he would be buried near Beauclerk and it was solely on her account that Sarah Fairbrother and he were deposited in the mausoleum in Kensal Green Cemetery, west of the main chapel, about sixty feet away from Beauclerk's grave.

Later life

The Duke of Cambridge served as colonel-in-chief of the 17th Lancers, Royal Artillery and Royal Engineers; The Middlesex Regiment (Duke of Cambridge's Own) and King's Royal Rifle Corps; colonel of the Grenadier Guards; honorary colonel of the 10th (Duke of Cambridge's Own) Bengal Lancers, 20th Duke of Cambridge's Own Punjabis, 4 Battalion Suffolk Regiment, 1st City of London Volunteer Brigade and the Scots Fusilier Guards. He became the ranger of Hyde Park and St. James's Park in 1852, and of Richmond Park in 1857; governor of the Royal Military Academy in 1862, and its president in 1870. He was the patron of the Oxford Military College from 1876 to 1896.

Cambridge's strength and hearing began to fade in his later years. He was unable to ride at Queen Victoria's funeral and had to attend in a carriage. He paid his last visit to Germany in August 1903. He died of a haemorrhage of the stomach in 1904 at Gloucester House, Piccadilly, London. His remains were buried five days later next to those of his wife in Kensal Green Cemetery, London.

In 1904, his estate was probated at under £121,000.

The Duke is today commemorated by an equestrian statue standing on Whitehall in central London; it is positioned outside the front door of the War Office that he so strongly resisted. He is also commemorated by two street names in Kingston Vale and Norbiton, in southwest London, George Road and Cambridge Road; the Duke inherited much of the land in the area from his father in 1850.

Titles, styles and honours

Titles and styles
26 March 1819 – 8 July 1850: His Royal Highness Prince George of Cambridge
8 July 1850 – 17 March 1904: His Royal Highness The Duke of Cambridge

As the male-line grandson of a King of Hanover, Prince George of Cambridge also bore the titles of 'Prince of Hanover' and 'Duke of Brunswick and Lüneburg'.

His title, 'Duke of Cambridge', fell into extinction upon his death. It was not revived until 107 years later, when Elizabeth II (Prince George's great-great-niece through his sister Princess Mary Adelaide of Cambridge) awarded the title to her grandson, Prince William, on 29 April 2011, the day of his wedding.

Honours
British
KG: Royal Knight of the Most Noble Order of the Garter, 15 August 1835
KP: Extra Knight of the Most Illustrious Order of St Patrick, 17 November 1851
Hon DCL: Doctor of Civil Law, Oxford University, 1853
GCB: Knight Grand Cross of the Most Honourable Order of the Bath (military division), 5 July 1855
PC: Privy Counsellor of Great Britain, 1856
Hon LLD: Doctor of Laws, Cambridge University, 1864
PC (I): Privy Counsellor of Ireland, 21 April 1868
Hon LLD: Doctor of Laws, Dublin University, 1868
GCMG: Grand Master and Principal Knight Grand Cross of the Most Distinguished Order of St Michael and St George, 30 May 1877
GCSI: Extra Knight Grand Commander of the Most Exalted Order of the Star of India, 2 June 1877
KT: Extra Knight of the Most Ancient and Most Noble Order of the Thistle, 17 September 1881
GCIE: Extra Knight Grand Commander of the Most Eminent Order of the Indian Empire, 21 June 1887
VD: Volunteer Decoration
ADC: Personal Aide-de-Camp to the Sovereign, 1 November 1895
KJStJ: Knight of Justice of the Most Venerable Order of the Hospital of St John of Jerusalem, 1896
GCVO: Knight Grand Cross of the Royal Victorian Order, 30 June 1897

Foreign
Grand Cross of the Royal Hanoverian Guelphic Order, 1825 (Hanover)
Grand Cross of the Order of Henry the Lion, 1835 (Brunswick)
Knight of the Order of St George, 1839 (Hanover)
Grand Cross of the Royal Order of the Legion of Honour, September 1843 (France)
Grand Cross of the House Order of the Golden Lion, 18 December 1844 (Hesse-Kassel)
Knight of the Order of the Black Eagle, 7 September 1852 (Prussia)
Knight of the House Order of Fidelity, 1856 (Baden)
Grand Cross of the Order of the Zähringer Lion, 1856 (Baden)
Grand Cross of the Royal Hungarian Order of St Stephen, 1857 (Austria)
Knight of the Order of the Gold Lion of the House of Nassau, September 1859 (Nassau)
Grand Cross of the House Order of the Wendish Crown, with Crown in Ore, 13 August 1865 (Mecklenburg)
Grand Cross of the Royal Military Order of the Tower and Sword, 8 January 1866 (Portugal)
Knight of the Order of the Elephant, 26 March 1867 (Denmark)
Knight of the Order of St Andrew the Apostle the First-called, 1874 (Russia)
Grand Commander's Cross of the Royal House Order of Hohenzollern, 23 September 1880 (Prussia)

Issue
The Duke of Cambridge and Mrs. FitzGeorge had three sons, two of whom were born before their marriage in contravention to the Royal Marriages Act 1772,
and all of whom pursued military careers.

Ancestors

Notes

References

Bibliography 

 Beckett, Ian F.W. A British Profession of Arms: The Politics of Command in the Late Victorian Army (U of Oklahoma Press, 2018).

External links

National Portrait Gallery

1819 births
1904 deaths
19th-century British people
20th-century British people
Princes of the United Kingdom
British field marshals
Dukes of Cambridge
George, Duke of Cambridge, Prince
House of Hanover
 
British Army personnel of the Crimean War
Burials at Kensal Green Cemetery
12th Royal Lancers officers
17th Lancers officers
Grenadier Guards officers
Scots Guards officers
Nobility from Hanover
Barons Culloden
Members of the Privy Council of the United Kingdom
Members of the Privy Council of Ireland
Knights of the Garter
Knights of the Thistle
Cambridge, Prince George, Duke of
Knights Grand Cross of the Order of the Bath
Knights Grand Cross of the Order of St Michael and St George
Knights Grand Commander of the Order of the Indian Empire
Knights Grand Cross of the Royal Victorian Order
Knights Grand Commander of the Order of the Star of India
Grand Crosses of the Order of Saint Stephen of Hungary
Knights of Justice of the Order of St John
People of the National Rifle Association